Hélène Rollès (at times just the mononym Hélène; born 20 December 1966) is a French actress and singer, primarily known for her major role in the TV sitcom Helen and the boys (Hélène et les Garçons), alongside Sébastien Roch.

Life and career

In the 1990s, she played Hélène Girard, Justine's old sister, in the sitcom Premiers Baisers. Due to the interest around the role character, Jean-Luc Azoulay decided to create a sitcom based on her character in 1992 and named it Hélène et les Garçons.

Hélène et les Garçons became an instant television success. This TV show which recounts love stories of a student band at the university, garnered up to 6,500,000 viewers every night.
 
The show has been adapted for foreign countries like the US, Norway, Spain, Denmark, Greece, Sweden and Russia.

Rollès made her musical debut with Pour l'amour d'un garçon and Peut être qu'en septembre.

Her career peaked in 1993, when she published her most popular album, Je m'appelle Hélène, which sold 900,000 and went triple platinum. In February 1993, Rollès was nominated for a Victoires de la Musique. The same year, the book Je m'appelle Hélène was published by editions Montjoie.

The director Morgan Delaunay has published a documentary on the net titled Hélène Rolles, une étoile pas comme les autres.

She participated in a spin-off series of la Ferme Célébrités and Première Compagnie (reality show).

In February 2013, Rollès adopted two children, a brother and a sister, from Ethiopia.

Filmography

Discography

Albums

Compilation albums

Live albums

Singles
1988: Dans ses grands yeux verts
1989: Ce train qui s'en va
1989: Sarah
1990: Jimmy, Jimmy
1990: Makko (Générique du dessin animé)
1992: Pour l'amour d'un garçon (#4 in France)
1993: Peut être qu'en septembre (#11 in France)
1993: Dona, Dona (duo Dorothée)
1993: Je m'appelle Hélène (#5 in France)
1994: Dans les yeux d'une fille
1994: Amour secret
1994: Le Miracle de l'amour
1995: Moi aussi je vous aime
1995: Imagine
1995: Toi
1996: Je t'aime
1997: À force de solitude
1998: C'est parce que je t'aime
2003: Que du vent
2003: Sur mon étoile
2010: Salut, ça va? (duo Dorothée)
2011: Les Mystères de l'amour
2012: C'était à toi que je pensais
2012: Robin des bois
2016: Effacer le passé
2016: Nos tendres années
2017: Di dou dam
2021: Un amour

Videography

 Hélène 1992
 Hélène 1993
 Zénith 1993
 Hélène 1994
 Hélène 1995
 Bercy 1995

References

External links 

 Hélène Rollès, toujours par amour
 Toi, Hélène Rollès
 Hélène notre étoile
 Hélène Rollès Online 
 Hélène et les garcons, and Hélène Rollès

1966 births
Living people
French women singers
French film actresses
French television actresses
20th-century French actresses
21st-century French actresses
People from Le Mans